The archaeological Neman culture existed from the 7th to 3rd millennium BC, starting in the Mesolithic and continued into the middle Neolithic. It was located in the upper basin of the Neman River (present-day northern Poland, southern Lithuania, western Belarus and Kaliningrad Oblast). In the north, the Neman culture bordered the Kunda culture during the Mesolithic and the Narva culture during the Neolithic.

Mesolithic
During the Atlantic period, the climate warmed and broad-leaved tree forests covered much of the territory. The migrating reindeer, mainstay of the Paleolithic hunters, retreated to the North and were followed by forest animals. The people adapted to the changed environment. They were still nomadic, but traveled shorter distances and stayed in the same place for longer periods. The archaeologists found small camps used just once and larger camps to which hunters returned repeatedly. These camps were usually located near lakes or rivers. The people used to hunt with arrows and spears and fish with harpoons. The flint tools of Mesolithic Neman culture were influenced both by microliths from southeastern Europe and macroliths from northern Europe (Maglemosian culture). Therefore, the culture was initially called Microlithic–Macrolithic culture to avoid confusion with the already established Neolithic Neman culture. Despite variety of influences, the culture was rather stable for 2500–3000 years indicating no significant migrations. Therefore, the artifacts are rather unvaried stock of arrowheads, trapezoid blades, oval axes.

Neolithic
The Neolithic began with the appearance of pottery in mid 5th millennium BC. The Semi-Neolithic Neman culture was a successor of the Mesolithic Neman culture. Most of flint tools are very similar between both cultures. A new widespread development was knives with sharpened and flared point. Pottery of the Neman culture had pointed bottoms and was made of clay mixed with organic matter or crushed quartzite. Some latter examples have flat bottoms. The vessels were a bit narrower and curvier than of the Narva culture. They were decorated with a thin layer of white clay and rows of small imprints around the rim. The rest of the vessel had diagonal stripes forming a pattern of a fishnet or more rows of small imprints. Some pottery found in settlements of the Neman culture was made by Narva culture. Such phenomenon is explained by trade of flint, which Narva culture in the north did not have. Towards the end of the Neman culture, the pottery became more varied and exhibits influence of the Rzucewo culture: imprints made by a cord or resembling a fir. Eventually, the culture was overtaken by the Corded Ware culture and the Globular Amphora culture.

Citations

Cited sources

Archaeological cultures of Eastern Europe
Archaeological cultures in Belarus
Archaeological cultures in Lithuania
Archaeological cultures in Poland
Archaeological cultures in Russia
7th-millennium BC establishments